Hearts Beat Loud is a 2018 American comedy-drama music film directed by Brett Haley, from a screenplay by Haley and Marc Basch. It stars Nick Offerman, Kiersey Clemons, Ted Danson, Sasha Lane, Blythe Danner and Toni Collette, and follows a Brooklyn record store owner who tries to convince his daughter to start a band with him after a song they recorded goes viral.

It had its world premiere at the 2018 Sundance Film Festival on January 26, 2018 and was released in the United States on June 8, 2018, by Gunpowder & Sky.

Plot
Frank Fisher, a former musician who lost his wife in a biking accident, owns a failing vinyl shop called Red Hook Records in Brooklyn, New York. His daughter Sam is slated to leave for the West Coast to study pre-med at the end of the summer. Despite Sam's desire to study and spend time with her girlfriend Rose, Frank incessantly urges her to play music with him. Sam reveals she wrote a song titled “Hearts Beat Loud” during a jam session. They spend the night recording and mixing the entire song. Frank uploads the song to Spotify without Sam's permission and it becomes a viral success.

Frank tries to convince Sam to start a music duo, but the latter is reluctant, still determined to become a doctor. Regardless, Frank adopts an off-beat band name “We’re Not A Band” from Sam's refusals. Sam secretly writes another song about her relationship with Rose called "Blink (One Million Miles)," while Frank writes "Everything Must Go" about his closing business. In the meantime, Frank's landlady and loyal customer, Leslie offer a proposition to save Red Hook by remodeling it with a café to potentially lure more customers, to which Frank is stubbornly hesitant.

A talent agent approaches Frank and offers We’re Not A Band a record deal. Frank is ecstatic at the opportunity, but Sam turns it down. When Frank brings up her deceased mother's possible approving view of the opportunity, Sam angrily storms out. Despondent, Frank bitterly rejects Leslie's offer to save Red Hook. Frank initiates a massive sale on the shop's final day of business and apologizes to Leslie through a voicemail. He is visited by Sam, who with a change of heart convinces Frank to play live music with her as the customers browse the shop. The duo plays “Hearts Beat Loud,” "Blink (One Million Miles)", and "Everything Must Go," pleasing the onlooking, ever-growing customers, including Leslie and Rose. At summer's end, Red Hook closes and Frank accepts a job at a bar owned by his best friend, Dave.  In Frank's final scene, Leslie comes into the bar, and she and Frank talk animatedly over drinks as the camera fades out of the scene. Sam moves to the West Coast to begin her studies and sings “Hearts Beat Loud” solo during an open mic event.

Cast
 Nick Offerman as Francis James "Frank" Fisher, Sam's father, Marianne's son, and Dave's best friend
 Kiersey Clemons as Samantha Lee "Sam" Fisher, Frank's daughter, Marianne's granddaughter, and Rose's girlfriend
 Toni Collette as Leslie, Frank's landlady
 Sasha Lane as Rose, Sam's girlfriend
 Ted Danson as Dave, Frank's best friend
 Blythe Danner as Marianne Fisher, Frank's mother and Sam's grandmother

Production
In July 2017, Kiersey Clemons joined the cast of the film, with Brett Haley directing from a screenplay he co-wrote with Marc Basch. Houston King, Sam Bisbee, and Sam Slater produced the film, under their Burn Later Productions, Houston King Productions and Park Pictures banners respectively. That same month, Nick Offerman, Toni Collette, Sasha Lane, Ted Danson and Blythe Danner joined the cast of the film. Keegan DeWitt composed the film's score and all of the original songs, including the title track "Hearts Beat Loud".

Principal photography began in August 2017. It was filmed in Red Hook, Brooklyn, at locations including the coffee shop Baked and the bar Sunny's.

Release
The film had its world premiere at the Sundance Film Festival on January 26, 2018. Prior to, Sony Pictures Worldwide Acquisitions and Gunpowder & Sky acquired international and U.S. distribution rights to the film, respectively. It was released on June 8, 2018.

Reception
The website's critical consensus reads, "Thoroughly sweet, comfortably familiar, and elevated by the chemistry between Nick Offerman and Kiersey Clemons, Hearts Beat Loud offers feel-good father-daughter drama." On Metacritic, the film has a weighted average score of 65 out of 100, based on 29 critics, indicating "generally favorable reviews".

References

External links
 

2018 films
American comedy-drama films
American LGBT-related films
2018 independent films
Films about music and musicians
Films about parenting
Films directed by Brett Haley
Films scored by Keegan DeWitt
Films set in Brooklyn
Films shot in New York City
2018 LGBT-related films
LGBT-related comedy-drama films
2018 comedy-drama films
Films about father–daughter relationships
2010s English-language films
2010s American films